Manpo is a city of northwestern Chagang Province, North Korea. As of 2008, it had an estimated population of 116,760. It looks across the border to the city of Ji'an, Jilin province, China.

History
Manp'o was incorporated as a city in October 1967. Earlier, in October 1949, it had been combined into a single county consisting Manpo-myon, Kosan-myon, Oegwi-myon, Iso-myon and Sijung-myon, which were split from Kanggye-gun. Manpo had first been mentioned in 1424, in the Veritable Records of the Joseon Dynasty. During the Joseon Dynasty, fortresses and camps were built in this area, for which the city is now named after.

Geography
Along the shores of the Yalu River, which various tributaries flow into, and the Kŏnp'o River are the small Kosan Plain and the Kŏnha Plain. 

The majority of Manpo is located at a lower height than the rest of Jagang Province, though the northeast and east do have areas of higher elevation, which gradually slopes down to the much lower areas along the banks of the Yalu River. Around 75.6% of the city is covered by forests.

Climate
Manpo has a humid continental climate (Köppen climate classification: Dwa).

Administrative divisions
Manp'o is divided into 11 tong and 15 ri:

Economy
Lumber processing and transportation are well developed.

Transportation 
Man'po is connected to other cities in North Korea by road, and by the Unha, Manpo and Pukbunaeryuk lines of the Korean State Railway.

A new trolleybus line opened with its first phase in December 2019 from Kunmak-dong to Pyolo-dong. The total length is around 5 km.

See also

Geography of North Korea

References

Further reading

Dormels, Rainer. North Korea's Cities: Industrial facilities, internal structures and typification. Jimoondang, 2014.

External links

North Korea Uncovered , (North Korea Google Earth) see much of Manpo's industrial and political infrastructure on Google Earth.
City profile of Manpo 

Cities in Chagang
China–North Korea border crossings